The bluefinned butterfish (Odax cyanoallix) a species of marine ray-finned fish, a weed whiting from the family Odacidae, which is found only around Three Kings Islands about 80 km north of New Zealand. It is found in shallow reef areas where brown seaweed is abundant.  This species can reach a length of  SL.  It is of minor importance to local commercial fisheries. Isolated individuals have been recorded elsewhere around the northern North Island.

References

bluefinned butterfish
Endemic marine fish of New Zealand
Fish of the North Island
bluefinned butterfish